Pleystor Glacier is the 2.2 km long and 1.2 km wide glacier on the west side of Brugmann Mountains on Liège Island in the Palmer Archipelago, Antarctica.  It is situated south-southwest of Zbelsurd Glacier, draining the south slopes of Mishev Bluff, the southwest slopes of Pavlov Peak and the northwest slopes of Mount Vesalius, and flowing west-northwestwards into Vapa Cove.

The glacier is named after the Thracian god Pleystor.

Location
British mapping in 1978 and 1980.

See also
 List of glaciers in the Antarctic
 Glaciology

Maps
 British Antarctic Territory.  Scale 1:200000 topographic map.  DOS 610 Series, Sheet W 64 60.  Directorate of Overseas Surveys, UK, 1978.
 British Antarctic Territory.  Scale 1:200000 topographic map.  DOS 610 Series, Sheet W 64 62.  Directorate of Overseas Surveys, UK, 1980.
 Antarctic Digital Database (ADD). Scale 1:250000 topographic map of Antarctica. Scientific Committee on Antarctic Research (SCAR). Since 1993, regularly upgraded and updated.

References
 Bulgarian Antarctic Gazetteer. Antarctic Place-names Commission. (details in Bulgarian, basic data in English)
 Pleystor Glacier. SCAR Composite Antarctic Gazetteer.

External links
 Pleystor Glacier. Copernix satellite image

Glaciers of the Palmer Archipelago
Bulgaria and the Antarctic
Liège Island